Agate Rašmane (born 22 August 1997) is a Latvian sports shooter. She competed in the women's 10 metre air pistol event at the 2020 Summer Olympics.

References

External links
 

1997 births
Living people
Latvian female sport shooters
Olympic shooters of Latvia
Shooters at the 2020 Summer Olympics
People from Dobele
Shooters at the 2014 Summer Youth Olympics
Shooters at the 2015 European Games
Shooters at the 2019 European Games
European Games medalists in shooting
European Games silver medalists for Latvia